Río Iglesias is a corregimiento in Chepigana District, Darién Province, Panama with a population of 1,672 as of 2010. Its population as of 1990 was 1,348; its population as of 2000 was 1,468.

See also
Filo del Tallo

References

Corregimientos of Darién Province